This is a list of all waterways named as rivers in New Zealand.

A
 Aan River
 Acheron River (Canterbury)
 Acheron River (Marlborough)
 Ada River
 Adams River
 Ahaura River
 Ahuriri River
 Ahuroa River
 Akatarawa River
 Ākitio River
 Alexander River
 Alfred River
 Allen River
 Alma River
 Alph River (Ross Dependency)
 Anatoki River
 Anatori River
 Anaweka River
 Anne River
 Anti Crow River
 Aongatete River
 Aorangiwai River
 Aorere River
 Aparima River
 Arahura River
 Arapaoa River
 Araparera River
 Arawhata River
 Arnold River
 Arnst River
 Aropaoanui River
 Arrow River
 Arthur River
 Ashburton River / Hakatere
 Ashley River / Rakahuri
 Avoca River (Canterbury)
 Avoca River (Hawke's Bay)
 Avon River / Ōtākaro
 Avon River (Marlborough)
 Awakari River
 Awakino River (Canterbury) and its East and West branches
 Awakino River (Northland)
 Awakino River (Waikato)
 Awanui River
 Awapoko River
 Awarau River
 Awaroa River (Far North)
 Awaroa River (Kaipara)
 Awaroa River (Waikato River tributary)
 Awaroa River (Kawhia Harbour tributary)
 Awaroa River (Tasman)
 Awarua River (Northland)
 Awarua River (Southland)
 Awatere River
 Awatere River (Gisborne)
 Awhea River

B
 Balfour River
 Barlow River
 Barn River
 Barrier River
 Baton River
 Bealey River
 Beaumont River
 Beautiful River
 Bettne River
 Big River (Buller)
 Big River (Grey)
 Big River (Southland)
 Big River (Tasman)
 Big Wainihinihi Creek
 Blackwater River (Tasman)
 Blackwater River (Buller River tributary)
 Blackwater River (Little Grey River tributary)
 Blairich River
 Blind (Otūwhero) River
 Blue Duck River
 Blue Grey River
 Blue River
 Bluff River
 Blythe River
 Bonar River
 Boulder River
 Bowen River
 Boyle River
 Branch River (Taylor River tributary)
 Branch River (Wairau River tributary)
 Broken River
 Brown Grey River
 Brown River (Marlborough)
 Brown River (Tasman)
 Brown River (West Coast)
 Buller River
 Burke River
 Butler River

C
 Callery River
 Cam River (Marlborough)
 Cam River
 Camelot River
 Cameron River
 Cape River
 Caples River
 Cardrona River
 Careys Creek
 Carrick River
 Cascade River
 Cass River (Mackenzie District)
 Cass River (Selwyn District)
 Castaly River
 Castle River (Marlborough)
 Castle River (Southland)
 Castle River (Wellington)
 Catlins River
 Cavendish River
 Charwell River
 Chatterton River
 Christopher River
 Clark River
 Clarke River (Grey District)
 Clarke River (Tasman)
 Clarke River (Westland District)
 Clearwater River
 Cleddau River
 Clinton River
 Clive River
 Clutha River
 Clyde River
 Coal River (Canterbury)
 Coal River (Fiordland)
 Cobb River
 Collins River
 Conway River
 Cook River / Weheka
 Copland River
 Cox River
 Crooked River
 Cropp River
 Crow River (Canterbury)
 Crow River (West Coast)
 Cust River

D
 D'Urville River
 Dane River
 Dark River
 Dart River / Te Awa Whakatipu
 Dart River (Tasman)
 Deception River
 Deepdale River
 Devil River
 Dickson River
 Dillon River
 Dobson River
 Donald River (Hawke's Bay)
 Donald River (West Coast)
 Donne River
 Doon River
 Doubtful River
 Doubtless River
 Douglas River
 Dove River (Canterbury)
 Dove River (Tasman)
 Drake River
 Dry Awarua River
 Dry River (Tasman)
 Dry River (New Zealand)
 Duncan River

E
 Earnscleugh River
 Eastern Hohonu River
 Eastern Hutt River
 Eastern Waiotauru River
 Edison River
 Edith River
 Edwards River (Mid Canterbury)
 Edwards River (North Canterbury)
 Eglinton River
 Electric River
 Elizabeth River
 Ellis River
 Empson River
 Esk River (Canterbury)
 Esk River (Hawke's Bay)
 Esperance River
 Evans River
 Eyre River

F
 Fairhall River
 Falls River
 Fish River
 Flaxbourne River
 Fleming River
 Forbes River
 Forgotten River
 Fork Stream
 Four Mile River
 Fox River (Buller)
 Fox River (Westland)
 Frances River
 Freshwater River
 Fyfe River

G
 Garry River
 Gelt River
 George River
 Glaisnock River
 Glencoe River
 Glenrae River
 Glenroy River
 Glentui River
 Gloster River
 Godley River
 Goldney River
 Gorge River
 Goulter River
 Graham River
 Grantham River
 Gray River
 Grays River
 Grebe River
 Greenstone River
 Greenstone River / Hokonui
 Greta River
 Grey River / Māwheranui
 Guide River
 Gulliver River
 Gunn River
 Gunner River

H
 Haast River
 Hacket River
 Hae Hae Te Moana River
 Hakaru River
 Hakataramea River
 Hall River
 Halswell River
 Hamilton River
 Hangaroa River
 Hangatahua (Stony) River, Taranaki
 Hanmer River
 Haparapara River
 Hapuawai River
 Hapuka River
 Hāpuku River
 Harman River
 Harper River
 Harrison River
 Hātea River
 Haumi River
 Haupiri River
 Hautapu River (Manawatū-Whanganui)
 Hautapu River (Wairoa District)
 Havelock River
 Hawai River
 Hawdon River
 Hāwea River
 Hawkins River
 Hay River
 Heaphy River
 Hector River
 Hemphill River
 Henry River
 Herekino River
 Heron River
 Hewson River
 Hikurangi River
 Hikurua River
 Hikutaia River
 Hikuwai River
 Hinatua River
 Hinds River
 Hinemaiaia River
 Hinemoatū / Howard River
 Hodder River
 Hokitika River
 Hollyford River / Whakatipu Kā Tuka
 Hook River
 Hooker River
 Hookhamsnyvy Creek
 Hope River (Canterbury)
 Hope River (Tasman)
 Hope River (West Coast)
 Hopkins River
 Horahora River
 Horomanga River
 Hororata River
 Hossack River
 Hoteo River
 Huangarua River
 Huia River
 Hunter River
 Huriwai River
 Hurunui River
 Hurunui River South Branch
 Huxley River

I
 Ihungia River
 Ihuraua River
 Inangahua River
 Irene River
 Irwell River

J
 Jackson River
 Jed River
 Jerry River
 Joe River
 Joes River
 John o'Groats River
 Johnson River
 Jollie River
 Jordan River
 Juno River

K
 Kaeo River
 Kahurangi River
 Kahutara River
 Kaiapoi River
 Kaihu River
 Kaiikanui River
 Kaikou River
 Kaimarama River
 Kaipara River
 Kaipo River
 Kaituna River (Bay of Plenty)
 Kaituna River (Canterbury)
 Kaituna River (Marlborough)
 Kaituna River (Tasman)
 Kaiwaka River
 Kaiwakawaka River
 Kaiwara River
 Kaiwharawhara Stream
 Kaiwhata River
 Kaka River
 Kakanui River
 Kakapo River
 Kākāpōtahi River / Little Waitaha River
 Kaniere River
 Kapowai River
 Karakatuwhero River
 Karamea River
 Karangarua River
 Karetu River (Canterbury)
 Karetu River (Northland)
 Karukaru River
 Katikara River
 Kauaeranga River
 Kaukapakapa River
 Kauru River
 Kawakawa River
 Kawarau River
 Kawhatau River
 Kedron River
 Kekerengu River
 Kenana River
 Kennet River
 Kereu River
 Kerikeri River (Northland)
 Kerikeri River (Waikato)
 Kitchener River
 Kiwi River
 Kohaihai River
 Kokatahi River
 Komata River
 Kopeka River
 Kopuapounamu River
 Kopuaranga River
 Koranga River
 Korimako Stream
 Kowai River
 Kowhai River
 Kuaotunu River
 Kumengamatea River
 Kumeu River
 Kuratau River
 Kurow River

L
 L II River
 Lambert River
 Landsborough River
 Lawrence River
 Leader River
 Leatham River
 Lee River (Canterbury)
 Lee River (Tasman)
 Leslie River
 Lewis River (Canterbury)
 Lewis River (West Coast)
 Light River
 Lilburne River
 Lindis River
 Little Akatarawa River
 Little Awakino River
 Little Boulder River
 Little Crow River
 Little Devil River
 Little Hohonu River
 Little Hope River
 Little Kowai River
 Little Lottery River
 Little Onahau River
 Little Opawa River
 Little Pokororo River
 Little Pomahaka River
 Little River
 Little Slate River
 Little Totara River
 Little Waingaro River
 Little Wanganui River
 Lochy River
 Lord River
 Lords River
 Lottery River
 Lud River
 Lyvia River

M
 Macaulay River
 Macfarlane River
 Mackenzie River
 Maclennan River
 Maerewhenua River
 Mahakirau River
 Mahitahi River
 Mahurangi River
 Maitai River
 Makahu River
 Mākākahi River
 Makara River (Chatham Islands)
 Mākara River (Wellington)
 Makarau River
 Makaretu River
 Makarewa River
 Makarora River
 Makaroro River
 Makatote River
 Jacobs River
 Makerikeri River
 Makikihi River
 Makino River
 Makotuku River
 Makuri River
 Manaia River
 Manakaiaua River
 Manawapou River
 Manawatū River
 Mandamus River
 Mangaaruhe River
 Mangahao River
 Mangahauini River
 Mangaheia River
 Mangakahia River
 Mangakarengorengo River
 Mangakuri River
 Mangamaire River
 Mangamuka River
 Manganui River (Northland)
 Manganui River (Taranaki)
 Manganui River (Waikato)
 Manganuiohou River
 Manganuioteao River
 Mangaone River (Hawke's Bay)
 Mangaone River (Manawatū-Whanganui)
 Mangaoparo River
 Mangaorino River
 Mangaotaki River
 Mangapa River
 Mangapai River
 Mangapapa River (Bay of Plenty)
 Mangapapa River (Manawatū-Whanganui)
 Mangapehi River
 Mangapoike River
 Mangapu River
 Mangaroa River
 Mangatainoka River
 Mangatāwhiri River
 Mangatera River
 Mangatete River
 Mangatewai River
 Mangatewainui River
 Mangatokerau River
 Mangatoro River
 Mangatu River
 Mangaturuturu River
 Mangawai River
 Mangawharariki River
 Mangawhero River
 Māngere River
 Mangles River
 Mangonuiowae River
 Mangorewa River
 Manuherikia River
 Maori River
 Maraehara River
 Maraekakaho River
 Maraetaha River
 Maraetotara River
 Mārahau River
 Maramarua River
 Maramataha River
 Mararoa River
 Marchburn River
 Marokopa River
 Maropea River
 Martyr River
 Maruia River
 Mason River
 Mata River
 Matahaka River
 Mataikona River
 Matakana River
 Matakitaki River
 Matakohe River
 Mataroa River
 Mataura River
 Mathias River
 Matiri River
 Mātukituki River
 Maungakōtukutuku Stream
 Little Grey River
 McRae River
 Meola Creek
 Medina River
 Medway River
 Mike River
 Mikonui River
 Mimi River
 Miner River
 Mingha River
 Mistake River
 Misty River
 Moawhango River
 Moawhango West River
 Moeangiangi River
 Moeraki River
 Moerangi River
 Mohaka River
 Mōhakatino River
 Mokau River
 Mōkihinui River
 Mokomokonui River
 Mokoreta River
 Monowai River
 Montgomerie River
 Morgan River
 Morse River
 Motatapu River
 Mōtū River
 Motueka River
 Motukaika River
 Motunau River
 Motupiko River
 Motupipi River
 Motuti River
 Moutere River
 Mowbray River
 Mueller River
 Mungo River
 Murchison River
 Murray River

N
 Namu River
 Nancy River
 Nevis River
 Newton River (Buller River tributary)
 Newton River (Fiordland)
 Newtown River
 New River / Kaimata
 Ngakawau River
 Ngamuwahine River
 Ngaruroro River
 Ngatau River
 Ngatiawa River
 Ngunguru River
 Nina River
 Nokomai River
 North Barlow River
 North Mathias River
 North Ōhau River, Canterbury
 North Ōhau River, Wellington
 North Opuha River
 North River
 Nūhaka River
 Nukuhou River

O
 Oakura River
 Ōamaru River
 Oaro River
 Ōhau River (Canterbury)
 Ōhau River (Manawatū-Whanganui)
 Ohikaiti River
 Ohikanui River
 Ōhinemahuta River
 Ohinemaka River
 Ohinemuri River
 Ohinetamatea River
 Ōhura River
 Ohuri River
 Okana River
 Okaramio River
 Okari River
 Ōkārito River
 Okuku River
 Okura River
 Okuru River
 Okuti River
 Old Bed Eyre River
 Old Bed of Waipawa River
 Olivine River
 Omaha River
 Omaka River
 Omanaia River
 Omanawa River
 Omaru River
 Omaumau River
 Omoeroa River
 Onaero River
 Ōnahau River
 Onekaka River
 Oneone River
 Ongarue River
 Onyx River (Ross Dependency)
 Ōpaoa River
 Ōpārara River
 Oparau River
 Opatu River
 Ōpāwaho / Heathcote River
 Ōpihi River
 Opitonui River
 Opotoru River
 Opouawe River
 Opouri River
 Opouteke River
 Opuha River
 Opuiaki River
 Ōpūrehu River
 Orangipuku River
 Orari River
 Orauea River
 Ōrere River
 Ōreti River
 Ōrewa River
 Orikaka River
 Orira River
 Ōrongorongo River
 Oroua River
 Orowaiti River
 Oruaiti River
 Oruawharo River
 Oruru River
 Orutua River
 Otahu River
 Otaio River
 Ōtaki River
 Otama River
 Otamatapaio River
 Otamatea River (Hawke's Bay)
 Otamatea River (Northland)
 Ōtara River
 Otaua River
 Otehake River
 Otekaieke River
 Otematata River
 Ōtere River
 Oterei River
 Otiake River
 Ōtira River
 Ōtoko River
 Otorehinaiti River
 Otto River
 Otututu / Rough River
 Otūwhero River
 Ounuora River
 Ourauwhare River
 Owahanga River
 Ōwaka River
 Owen River

P
 Pahaoa River
 Pahau River
 Pahi River
 Pairatahi River
 Pakarae River
 Pakiri River
 Pakoka River
 Pakowhai River
 Pākuratahi River
 Pandora River
 Papakanui River
 Paranui River
 Parapara River
 Pareora River
 Paringa River
 Pariwhakaoho River
 Park River
 Pataua River
 Pātea River
 Paturau River
 Patutahi River
 Pearse River
 Pearson River
 Penk River
 Percival River
 Peria River
 Perth River
 Perunui River
 Phantom River
 Piako River
 Pitt River
 Pleasant River
 Poerua River (Grey District)
 Poerua River (Westland District)
 Pohangina River
 Pohuenui River
 Pokororo River
 Pomahaka River
 Pongaroa River
 Pōrangahau River
 Poroporo River
 Pororari River
 Porter River
 Postal River
 Potts River
 Pouawa River
 Poulter River
 Pourakino River
 Pourangaki River
 Price River (New Zealand)
 Pūerua River
 Puhi Puhi River
 Puhoi River
 Pukaki River
 Pūkio Stream
 Punakaiki River
 Punakitere River
 Pungapunga River
 Puniu River
 Pupuke River
 Purakaunui River
 Purangi River
 Puremāhaia River
 Puriri River
 Pyke River

R
 Racehorse River
 Rahu River
 Rai River
 Rainbow River
 Rainy River (Marlborough)
 Rainy River (Tasman)
 Rakaia River
 Rakeahua River
 Rangiora River
 Rangitaiki River
 Rangitane River
 Rangitata River
 Rangitīkei River
 Rappahannock River
 Raukokore River
 Rea River
 Red Pyke River
 Red River
 Rees River
 Reikorangi Stream
 Rerewhakaaitu River
 Retaruke River
 Ripia River
 Riuwaka River
 Roaring Lion River
 Robertson River
 Robinson River
 Rocky River
 Roding River
 Rogerson River
 Rolleston River
 Rolling River
 Ronga River
 Rooney River
 Rotokakahi River
 Rotokino River
 Rotowhenua River
 Ruakākā River
 Ruakituri River
 Ruakokoputuna River
 Ruamahanga River
 Rubicon River
 Ruera River
 Rum River
 Ryton River

S
 Sabine River
 Saxon River
 Saxton River
 Seaforth River
 Seaward River
 Selwyn River / Waikirikiri
 Serpentine River
 Severn River
 Shag River (Fiordland)
 Shenandoah River
 Sheriff River/Station Creek
 Sherry River
 Shin River
 Shotover River
 Sinclair River
 Skeet River
 Slate River
 Smite River
 Smoothwater River
 Smyth River
 Snow River
 Snowy River
 South Mathias River
 South Ohau River, Canterbury
 South Ohau River, Wellington
 South Opuha River
 Southern Waiotauru River
 Spey River (Southland)
 Spey River (Tasman)
 Spoon River
 Spray River
 Stafford River
 Stanley River (Canterbury)
 Stanley River (Tasman)
 Stanton River
 Stillwater River
 Stony River
 Stour River
 Strauchon River
 Styx Creek
 Styx River (Canterbury)
 Styx River (North Canterbury)
 Styx River (West Coast)
 Swift River
 Swin Burn
 Swin River

T
 Tadmor River
 Tahaenui River
 Tahakopa River
 Taharua River
 Taheke River
 Tahekeroa River
 Tahoranui River
 Taieri River
 Taiharuru River
 Taihiki River
 Taipa River
 Taipō River (Buller District)
 Taipo River (Westland District)
 Taipoiti River
 Tairua River
 Takahue River
 Tākaka River
 Takaputahi River
 Takiritawai River
 Takou River
 Talbot River
 Tāmaki River
 Tamaki River (Manawatū-Whanganui)
 Tangahoe River
 Tāngarākau River
 Tapu River
 Tapuaeroa River
 Tapuwae River
 Taramakau River
 Tarawera River
 Taringamotu River
 Taruarau River
 Taruheru River
 Tasman River
 Tass River
 Tauanui River
 Tauherenikau River
 Tauhoa River
 Taumona River
 Tauranga River
 Tauranga Taupō River
 Taurangakautuku River
 Tauraroa River
 Tautuku River
 Tauweru River
 Tawapuku River
 Tawarau River
 Tawatahi River
 Taylor River
 Te Arai River
 Te Awa Kairangi / Hutt River
 Te Hoe River
 Te Hoiere / Pelorus River
 Te Kapa River
 Te Kauparenui / Gowan River
 Te Mata River
 Te Naihi River
 Te Putaaraukai River
 Te Rahotaiepa River
 Te Wai-o-Pareira / Henderson Creek
 Te Wharau River
 Teal River
 Tekapo River
 Teme River
 Temuka River
 Tengawai River
 Teviot River
 Thomas River (Canterbury)
 Thomas River (West Coast)
 Thurso River
 Tīmaru River
 Tinline River
 Tinui River
 Tiraumea River (Manawatū-Whanganui)
 Tiraumea River (Tasman)
 Toaroha River
 Tohoratea River
 Toitoi River
 Tokanui River
 Tokomairaro River
 Tokomaru River
 Tolson River
 Tone River
 Tongapōrutu River
 Tongariro River
 Topuni River
 Tōrere River
 Torrent River
 Tōtara River (Buller District)
 Tōtara River (Westland District)
 Totarakaitorea River
 Townshend River
 Towy River
 Transit River
 Travers River
 Trent River
 Troyte River
 Tuamarina River
 Tuapeka River
 Tuke River
 Tukipo River
 Tukituki River
 Tummil River
 Tunakino River
 Turakina River
 Turanganui River (Gisborne)
 Turanganui River (Wellington)
 Turimawiwi River
 Turnbull River
 Tutaekuri River (Hawke's Bay)
 Tutaekuri River (Waiau River (Hawke's Bay) tributary)
 Tūtaekurī River (West Coast)
 Tutaki River
 Tūtoko River
 Tweed River
 Twizel River

U
 Uawa River
 Ugly River
 Upper Grey River
 Upukerora River
 Urenui River
 Utakura River

V
 Victoria River
 Von River

W
 Wahianoa River
 Wai-iti River
 Waianakarua River
 Waianiwaniwa River
 Waiapu River
 Waiariki River
 Waiaruhe River
 Waiatoto River
 Waiau River (Gisborne)
 Waiau River (Hawke's Bay)
 Waiau River (Southland)
 Waiau Toa / Clarence River
 Waiaua River (Bay of Plenty)
 Waiaua River (Taranaki)
 Waiau Uwha River
 Waihāhā River
 Waihao River
 Waiheke River
 Waihemo / Shag River
 Waihi River
 Waiho River
 Waihoihoi River
 Waihopai River (Marlborough)
 Waihopai River (Southland)
 Waihora River
 Waihou River
 Waihua River
 Waihuka River
 Waikaia River
 Waikākaho River
 Waikakariki River
 Waikamaka River
 Waikanae River
 Waikare River (Bay of Plenty)
 Waikare River (Northland)
 Waikaretāheke River
 Waikari River (Canterbury)
 Waikari River (Hawke's Bay)
 Waikato River
 Waikawa River
 Waikawau River (Thames-Coromandel District)
 Waikawau River (Waitomo District)
 Waikiti River
 Waikoau River
 Waikohu River
 Waikoropupu River
 Waikorure River
 Waikouaiti River
 Waikukupa River
 Waikura River (Raukokore River tributary)
 Waikura River (Hangaroa River tributary)
 Waima River
 Waimakariri River
 Waimamakau River
 Waimamaku River
 Waimana River
 Waimangarara River
 Waimangaroa River
 Waimarino River
 Waimata River
 Waimea River (Southland)
 Waimea River (Tasman)
 Waimeamea River
 Waingaro River (Tasman)
 Waingaro River (Waikato)
 Waingaromia River
 Waingawa River
 Waingongoro River
 Wainui River (Bay of Plenty)
 Wainui River (Manawatū-Whanganui)
 Wainui River (Northland)
 Wainui River (Tasman)
 Wainuiomata River
 Wainuiora River
 Wainuioru River
 Waioeka River
 Waiohine River
 Waiomoko River
 Waionepu River
 Waiorongomai River (Gisborne)
 Waiorongomai River (Wellington)
 Waiotahe River
 Waiotaka River
 Waiotama River
 Waiotauru River
 Waiotu River
 Waipā River
 Waipahi River
 Waipakihi River
 Waipaoa River
 Waipapa River (Bay of Plenty)
 Waipapa River (Northland)
 Waipapa River (Waikato)
 Waipati (Chaslands) River
 Waipara River (Canterbury)
 Waipara River (West Coast)
 Waipekakoura River
 Waipori River
 Waipoua River (Northland)
 Waipoua River (Wellington)
 Waipu River
 Waipunga River
 Wairahi River
 Wairakei River
 Wairaki River
 Wairau River
 Wairaurāhiri River
 Waireia River
 Wairere River
 Wairoa River (Auckland)
 Wairoa River (Bay of Plenty)
 Wairoa River (Hawke's Bay)
 Wairoa River (Northland)
 Wairoa River (Tasman)
 Wairongomai River
 Wairua River
 Waita River
 Waitaha River
 Waitahaia River
 Waitahanui River
 Waitahu River
 Waitāhuna River
 Waitakaruru River
 Waitakere (Nile) River
 Waitākere River
 Waitaki River
 Waitangi River (Far North District)
 Waitangi River (Whangarei District)
 Waitangiroto River
 Waitangitāhuna River
 Waitara River
 Waitatapia Stream
 Waitati River
 Waitawheta River
 Waitekauri River
 Waitekuri River
 Waitepeka River
 Waitetuna River
 Waitewaewae River
 Waitoa River
 Waitoetoe River
 Waitohi River
 Waitōtara River
 Waitutu River
 Waiuku River
 Waiwawa River
 Waiwera River
 Waiwhakaiho River
 Waiwhango River
 Wakamarina River
 Wakapuaka River
 Walker River
 Wandle River
 Wanganui River
 Wangapeka River
 Wapiti River
 Warwick River
 Water of Leith
 Weiti River
 Wentworth River
 West Mathias River
 Western Hutt River
 Whakaikai River
 Whakaki River
 Whakanekeneke River
 Whakapapa River
 Whakapara River
 Whakapohai River
 Whakarapa River
 Whakatahine River
 Whakataki River
 Whakatāne River
 Whakatīkei River
 Whakaurekou River
 Whanaki River
 Whangae River
 Whangaehu River
 Whangamarino River
 Whangamaroro River
 Whangamoa River
 Whangamōmona River
 Whanganui River
 Whangaparāoa River
 Whareama River
 Whareatea River
 Wharehine River
 Wharekahika River
 Wharekawa River
 Wharekōpae River
 Wharemauku Stream
 Wharepapa River
 Whataroa River
 Whau River
 Whawanui River
 Wheao River
 Whenuakite River
 Whenuakura River
 Whirinaki River (Hawke's Bay)
 Whirinaki River (Northland)
 Whistler River
 Whitbourn River
 Whitcombe River
 White River
 White Rock River
 Whitestone River
 Whitewater River
 Wilberforce River
 Wild Natives River
 Wilkin River
 Wilkinson River
 Willberg River
 Williamson River
 Wills River
 Wilmot River
 Wilson River
 Windley River
 Windward River
 Winterton River
 Wolff River
 Woolley River
 Worsley Stream
 Wye River

Y
 Yankee River
 Yarra River
 Young River

See also
 List of rivers of New Zealand by length
 List of rivers
 List of rivers of Oceania
 List of islands of New Zealand#In rivers and lakes
 List of lakes in New Zealand
 List of rivers of Wellington Region

External links
 Land Information New Zealand – Search for Place Names